The Mitsubishi eK is a kei car series from Mitsubishi Motors, based on the long-running Minica, and first introduced on October 11, 2001. According to the company, the "eK" name stands for "excellent keijidōsha" or "excellent minicar".

Immediately upon its release it was the recipient of the Good Design Award by the Japanese Ministry of Economy, Trade and Industry in 2001. While the initial sales target was 10,000 units per month, it sold 13,000 in its first four days, and 20,000 by the end of October 2001. It is Mitsubishi's highest volume model in the Japanese domestic market, and total sales to 2005 are approximately 480,000. In Japan, it was sold at a specific retail chain called Car Plaza. Since June 8, 2005, Nissan has received 36,000 eK Wagons annually from Mitsubishi, to be sold within the domestic market as the Nissan Otti. The Otti was replaced by the Nissan Dayz on June 6, 2013, although the Otti was still sold alongside the Dayz until being discontinued on June 28, 2013.

In April 2016, Mitsubishi admitted that its employees had falsified fuel efficiency data for the eK Wagon, eK Space, Nissan Dayz and Nissan Dayz Roox. The resultant scandal culminated in Nissan acquiring a controlling interest in Mitsubishi the following month.



First generation (H81/H91/NA0; 2001–2006) 

In its first generation, it was available either as an eK Wagon (introduced on October 11, 2001), eK Sport (introduced on September 2, 2002), eK Classy (introduced on May 26, 2003) or eK Active (introduced on May 25, 2004). A facelifted eK Wagon was introduced on December 20, 2004. On December 20, 2005, the eK Classy was discontinued.

Second generation (H82/H92/NA1; 2006–2013) 

The second generation eK Wagon and eK Sport were released on September 13, 2006, priced from ¥913,500 to ¥1,484,700. The eK Active was discontinued at the time of the second generation's launch. A facelifted eK Wagon and eK Sport were released on August 21, 2008. The car sported a sliding door on the passenger side, which was unusual for its class.

Third generation (B11/B21/AA0; 2013–2019) 

The third generation eK Wagon and its new sportier variant, called the eK Custom, were released on June 6, 2013. It was the first major design update since when the eK began sales.

Fourth generation (B33/B34/B35/B36/B37/B38/B40/B5A; 2019–present) 

The fourth generation eK Wagon and its crossover SUV-styled variant, called the eK X (pronounced "eK Cross"), were unveiled on March 14, 2019 and released on March 28, 2019.

The battery electric version called the eK X EV was introduced on May 20, 2022 along with its Nissan-badged equivalent called the Nissan Sakura, which received different exterior and interior styling compared to the Dayz.

eK Space 
The Mitsubishi eK Space is a tall-height wagon kei car with rear sliding doors, based on the eK Wagon. The eK Space is also sold by Nissan as the Nissan Dayz Roox from 2014 to 2020 and as the Nissan Roox from 2020.

First generation (B11/B21/BA0; 2014–2020) 

The first generation eK Space and its sportier variant, called the eK Space Custom, were announced on October 3, 2013, and released on February 13, 2014.

Second generation (B34/B35/B37/B38/B44/B45/B47/B48; 2020–present) 

The second generation eK Space and its crossover SUV-styled variant, called the eK X Space (pronounced "eK Cross Space"), were unveiled on February 6, 2020, and went on sale on March 19, 2020.

Annual production and sales 
Production figures include OEM units manufactured on behalf of Nissan, while sales figures only include Mitsubishi-badged models.

(sources: Facts & Figures 2005, Facts & Figures 2009, Mitsubishi Motors website)

References

External links 

  (global)
  (ek Wagon)
  (ek X)
  (ek Space)
  (Dayz)
  (Roox)

eK
Cars introduced in 2001
2010s cars
2020s cars
Kei cars
Hatchbacks
Front-wheel-drive vehicles
All-wheel-drive vehicles
Vehicles with CVT transmission
Production electric cars
Electric city cars